Pierre Caron (15 August 1901 - 22 February 1971) was a French film director. At the end of the Second World War he was forced to flee to South America, where he later died.

Filmography 
 1920 : L'Homme qui vendit son âme au diable
 1923 : La Mare au diable
 1932 : Beauty Spot
 1934 : Votre sourire
 1935 : Juanita
 1936 : La Tentation
 1936 : Notre-Dame d'amour
 1936 : Les Demi vierges
 1936 : Blanchette
 1936 : Marinella
 1937 : La Fessée
 1937 : Cinderella
 1938 : Le Monsieur de 5 heures
 1938 : Mon oncle et mon curé
 1938 : Les Femmes collantes
 1938 : Riviera Express or L'Accroche-cœur)
 1938 : La Route enchantée
 1939 : Sing Anyway 
 1940 : Bécassine
 1941 : Ne bougez plus
 1942 : Pension Jonas
 1945 : Ils étaient cinq permissionnaires
 1956 : Eva no Brasil

External links
 Pierre Caron on the Internet Movie Database

1901 births
1971 deaths
French film directors